Casirate d'Adda (locally ) is a comune (municipality) in the Province of Bergamo in the Italian region of Lombardy, located about  east of Milan and about  southwest of Bergamo.

References